"The Responsibility of Intellectuals" is an essay by the American academic Noam Chomsky which was published as a special supplement by The New York Review of Books on 23 February 1967.

Content 
The article was written during the then-ongoing Vietnam War, as news of human rights abuses started to return to the United States, and as the war had increasingly became seen as a quagmire. An attack on the intellectual culture in the U.S., Chomsky argues that it is largely subservient to power. He is particularly critical of social scientists and technocrats, who he argued were providing a pseudo-scientific justification for the crimes of the state in regard to the Vietnam War. He notes that those who opposed the war on moral rather than technical grounds are "often psychologists, mathematicians, chemists, or philosophers, ... rather than people with Washington contacts, who, of course, realize that 'had they a new, good idea about Vietnam, they would get a prompt and respectful hearing' in Washington."

The topic was inspired by articles of Dwight Macdonald published after the Second World War who "asks the question: To what extent were the German or Japanese people responsible for the atrocities committed by their governments? And, quite properly, ... turns the question back to us: To what extent are the British or American people responsible for the vicious terror bombings of civilians, perfected as a technique of warfare by the Western democracies and reaching their culmination in Hiroshima and Nagasaki, surely among the most unspeakable crimes in history."

The article brought Chomsky to public attention as one of the leading American intellectuals in the movement against the Vietnam war.

In February 2017, on the 50th anniversary of the publication of ‘The Responsibility of Intellectuals’, a conference was held at University College London. In 2019, a book based on this conference was published entitled, The Responsibility of Intellectuals: Reflections by Noam Chomsky and others after 50 years and edited by three Chomsky biographers, Nicholas Allott, Chris Knight and Neil Smith. University College London attempted to impose restrictions on what could be said at the book launch. Chomsky described this as an ‘utter outrage’ and the restrictions were eventually dropped.

See also
 Intellectual responsibility – the more general concept found in philosophy

References

External links
  at The New York Review of Books
 Letter in response by George Steiner; reply by Noam Chomsky. March 23, 1967.
 Letters in response by Fryar Calhoun, E. B. Murray, and Arthur Dorfman; reply by Noam Chomsky. April 20, 1967.
 Letter in response by Raziel Abelson. April 20, 1967.

Works by Noam Chomsky
1967 essays
Works originally published in The New York Review of Books
Essays about politics
Works about intellectuals